5-Formyluracil is a heterocyclic organic base. It is produced from the oxidation of the methyl group of thymine. It is found in bacteriophages, prokaryotes, as well as mammalian cells. Being mutagenic, it is of particular interest in the field of epigenetics. It has been implicated in the formation of cancer causing cells.

References

Mutagens
Pyrimidinediones
Conjugated aldehydes